Chorispora sabulosa is a plant species in the genus Chorispora found in China and Pakistan.

References

External links
 Chorispora sabulosa at the Plant List (retrieved 22 March 2018)
 Chorispora sabulosa at Tropicos (retrieved 21 July 2016)

Brassicaceae